Zawieprzyce-Kolonia  is a village in the administrative district of Gmina Spiczyn, within Łęczna County, Lublin Voivodeship, in eastern Poland.

The village has a population of 330.

References

Zawieprzyce-Kolonia